Przytuki  is a village located in the administrative district of Gmina Kleczew, within Konin County, Greater Poland Voivodeship, in west-central Poland.

The village has a population of 170.

References

Przytuki